Virgil Oliver "Fireball" Trucks (April 26, 1917 – March 23, 2013) was an American Major League Baseball pitcher with the Detroit Tigers, St. Louis Browns, Chicago White Sox, Kansas City Athletics and New York Yankees between 1941 and 1958. He batted and threw right-handed.

A native of Birmingham, Alabama, Trucks posted a 177–135 win–loss record with 1,534 strikeouts and a 3.39 ERA in 2,682.2 innings pitched over a 17-year career.

Trucks was a two-time All-Star and a two-time league leader in shutouts.  In 1952, Trucks became the third major leaguer to throw two no-hitters in a season.  After his playing career, Trucks coached for several years in the major leagues.  At the time of his death in March 2013, he was one of the oldest living former major league players.

Career
The Detroit Tigers signed Trucks as an amateur in 1938. In his first pro season, Trucks set a minor league record with 418 strikeouts. He also threw four no-hitters in the minors. He debuted with the Tigers in the fall of 1941.

Trucks missed two seasons due to military service in World War II and was discharged from the Navy less than two weeks before his start in the second game of the 1945 World Series. Because of the war and returning servicemen, the American and National Leagues waived the rule requiring players to have been on the team's roster by September 1 to qualify for post-season play. He defeated the Chicago Cubs in that game. At the time of his death, he was the last living pitcher to face the Cubs in a World Series game. The only other pitcher to win a post-season game without winning a regular season game is Chris Carpenter of the 2012 St. Louis Cardinals.

In 1949, Trucks was selected for the MLB All-Star Game and he led the league in shutouts and strikeouts. In 1952, despite a 5–19 record and the Detroit Tigers' equally terrible 50-104-2 record, Trucks became just the third major league pitcher to hurl two no-hitters in one season (three others have since matched the feat). He won both no-hitters by a score of 1-0, beating the Washington Senators on May 15 and the New York Yankees on August 25. In the 1953 season, Trucks recorded a 20-10 record, 149 strikeouts and a 2.93 ERA and finished fifth in AL MVP voting. He had been traded early that season from the St. Louis Browns to the Chicago White Sox, becoming one of a small number of pitchers traded during a 20-win season.  He earned his second All-Star distinction in 1954, a year in which he led the AL in shutouts for a second time.

Along with his two no-hitters in his major league career, Trucks has also thrown four one-hitters and four two-hitters.

Coaching
After retiring as a player, Trucks joined the coaching staff of the Pittsburgh Pirates, winning the 1960 World Series with them against his old team, the Yankees.  He continued coaching with the Pirates, then coached the Atlanta Braves and ended his MLB career with the Tigers in 1974.

Personal life

Trucks was the uncle of Butch Trucks, a founding member of The Allman Brothers Band, and Chris Trucks.  Trucks' great nephew, Duane (Chris' son), is a member of Widespread Panic and has a brother, Derek, who is in a band with his wife, Susan Tedeschi, Tedeschi Trucks Band and was in the final lineup of the Allman Brothers Band.

Later life
Trucks was inducted into the Alabama Sports Hall of Fame in 1974 and into the Michigan Sports Hall of Fame in 1985.

In the summer of 2012, Trucks was injured in a fall, but he made a recovery. He died on March 23, 2013, at the age of 95 in Calera, Alabama.  He had been hospitalized with pneumonia shortly before his death.

See also

 List of Major League Baseball annual strikeout leaders
 List of Major League Baseball no-hitters

References

External links

Virgil Trucks at Baseballbiography.com

1917 births
2013 deaths
American League All-Stars
American League strikeout champions
St. Louis Browns players
Chicago White Sox players
Detroit Tigers players
Kansas City Athletics players
New York Yankees players
Major League Baseball pitchers
Pittsburgh Pirates coaches
Baseball players from Birmingham, Alabama
Andalusia Bulldogs players
Alexandria Aces players
Beaumont Exporters players
Buffalo Bisons (minor league) players
Miami Marlins (IL) players
People from Calera, Alabama
Deaths from pneumonia in Alabama
Trucks family
United States Navy personnel of World War II